Thorium(IV) sulfide (ThS2) is an inorganic chemical compound composed of one thorium atom ionically bonded to two atoms of sulfur. This salt is dark brown and has a melting point of 1905 °C. ThS2 adopts the same lattice structure as TiO2.

References

Sulfides
Thorium compounds
Dichalcogenides